West Midlands Fire Service (WMFS) is the fire and rescue service for the metropolitan county of West Midlands, England. The service is the second largest in England, after London Fire Brigade. The service has 38 fire stations, with a blended fleet of vehicles and specialist resources.

The service is led by Interim Chief Fire Officer Wayne Brown, who is overseen by the West Midlands Fire Authority. The Fire Authority is made up of 15 councillors who represent the seven councils within the West Midlands area. 

The service's headquarters is located in Nechells in Birmingham, which is also the home to Staffordshire and West Midlands Fire Control. The control room, based at WMFS headquarters is the main incident management and mobilising centre for both WMFS and Staffordshire Fire and Rescue Service.

History
The service was created in 1974, when the West Midlands county came into being. Prior to its creation, each of the county boroughs in the West Midlands area (Birmingham, Coventry, Dudley, Solihull, Walsall, Warley, West Bromwich and Wolverhampton) had their own fire brigade, the largest of which was the City of Birmingham Fire Brigade. WMFS was created by a merger of these, plus parts of Warwickshire Fire Brigade.

Performance
In 2018/2019, every fire and rescue service in England and Wales was subjected to a statutory inspection by Her Majesty's Inspectorate of Constabulary and Fire & Rescue Services (HIMCFRS). The inspection investigated how well the service performs in each of three areas. On a scale of outstanding, good, requires improvement and inadequate, West Midlands Fire and Rescue Service was rated as follows:

Workstreams 
The service divides its main functions into three areas: response, prevention and protection.

Response covers responding to emergencies, risk-based attendance standards, dynamic mobilising and Fire Control. Prevention covers their up-stream firefighting work that includes safe and well visits, community engagement, vulnerable persons officers and other individual and home-based fire prevention work. Protection covers their work around commercial and business fire safety, licensing and safety around buildings such as high-rise and apartment blocks.

Chief fire officers
The following people have held the office of chief fire officer:
19741975: George Merrell (Chief Officer of Birmingham Fire and Ambulance Service from 1969)
19751981: Tom Lister
19811990: Brian Fuller
19901998: Graham Meldum
19982003: Kenneth Knight
20032008: Frank Sheehan
20092013: Vijith Randeniya
20142023: Phil Loach
2023present: Wayne Brown

Fire stations and appliances 

West Midlands Fire Service operates 38 fire stations and employs 1,200 firefighters.
It has no on-call retained firefighters. All fire stations within the service are full-time, and work on two types of shift:

 CORE – 10-hour day-shift, or 14-hour shift-night shift covered by four watches, comprising Red, White, Blue and Green
 LATE – 12-hour shift running from 10am to 10pm covered by two watches of Orange and Purple

Tettenhall is the only solely late crewed station.
  
Following the closure of the Birmingham Central fire station, Birmingham city centre is now covered by three fire stations: Aston located and covering the northern side, Highgate located and covering the southern, central and eastern sides, and Ladywood covering the western side.

WMFS currently operates a fleet of pump rescue ladders, technical rescue pumps, brigade response vehicles, aerial ladder platforms which are also referred to as Hydraulic platforms. WMFS also operate business support vehicles in addition to various specialist appliances and transport vehicles.

Specialist units

Technical Rescue Unit 

Operating out of three locations, a primary base at Bickenhill fire station and two other bases at Wednesbury and Sutton Coldfield fire stations, the WMFS Technical Rescue Unit has purpose-built facilities to train in all specialist rescue disciplines, providing a local, regional and national response 24-hours a day, 365-days a year to any Urban Search And Rescue (USAR)/widescale flooding incident as well as the support necessary for specialist rescue incidents.

The team is made up of a Station Commander, Administration Officer, Equipment Maintenance Officer, USAR Training Officer, Search Dog Handler, and four watches each made up of a Watch Commander, Crew Commander and six Technicians. A further four watches are based at Wednesbury.

With shifts running along with the same colour watches as the core fire crews, watch based personnel work a 96-hour duty period with 48 hours on full duty and the remainder on the retained cover. Retained personnel can respond to base within 30 minutes of being required for multiple incident deployment.

The unit makes use of a wide range of vehicles and equipment to carry out their role. Each TRU base has two primary response vehicles: 
 Technical Rescue Support Unit – this 4x4 Mercedes Sprinter van provides a fast response capability for water, rope, and large animal rescues to get initial personnel and equipment to an incident as fast as possible.
 Technical Response Pump – based on a modified Volvo FL Pump Rescue Relay, this appliance carries enhanced rescue equipment at the expense of some firefighting equipment. This will respond to life-threatening incidents in the local station ground alongside the regular TRU callouts.

Additional vehicles and equipment that are based at Bickenhill:
 Four New Dimension Prime Movers – modified to be able to transport both New Dimension and regular WMFS demountable pods to the scene of an incident.
 Five Urban Search and Rescue Modules.
 One Trench Rescue Unit.

Additional vehicles and equipment that are based at Wednesbury:
 One Water Support Unit.

West Midlands United Kingdom International Search and Rescue
The United Kingdom International Search and Rescue Team (UK-ISAR) is on call 24 hours a day, 365 days a year to respond to humanitarian accidents or disasters anywhere in the world. There are 18 team members in West Midland Fire Services UK-ISAR, split into a Red Team and a Blue Team. The role of the team is to respond to support the UK Government when deploying personnel and equipment in response to international disasters such as earthquakes.

When on international call, a deployment is made of a team of six including the team leader from one of the groups and a Group Commander to act as the Operations Commander or Deployment Commander in charge of the UK International Search & Rescue Group (UKISARG).

The team should arrive in the affected country within 24 hours of the disaster occurring and be self-sufficient for periods of up to 10 days. Extensive specialist training over and above that normally required for firefighters is given to all team members.

Twelve members of the West Midlands team were deployed as part of the UKISAR (United Kingdom International Search And Rescue) mission to Haiti in the wake of the earthquake there on 12 January 2010. The team members were joined by two further members who had been in Sweden as part of a training exercise at the time of the earthquake. The team members were involved in the rescue of several people, including two-year-old Mia, who had been trapped for over four days.

Fire Investigation and Prevention Section
The Fire Investigation and Prevention Section (FIPS) was formed in 1983, and in 25 years has attended over 8,000 incidents.

FIPS investigates the cause of fire in a variety of different types of incidents including large fires, fires where the cause cannot be immediately determined, and fires where people may have been injured or died.

FIPS works closely with the Police, other Services, and organisations such as insurance companies when investigating fires. The officers also work on special projects including arson reduction policies and strategies, human behaviour in fire, the main causes of fire, and the compilation of any information to identify trends in fire causes. This information is vital when undertaking targeted initiatives and campaigns relating to the education of fire safety awareness.

Notable incidents
 2013 Smethwick fire – 35-pump fire, 50,000 tonnes of plastic and Jayplas plastics and paper recycling plant on fire, sparked by a Chinese lantern.

Recruitment controversy
In 2019, the WMFS was accused of using discriminatory practices in recruitment of new firefighters. Once candidates had passed a reactions test, they moved on to a numerical, verbal and mechanical reasoning exam. Media reports stated that black, Asian and minority ethnic and female candidates were deemed to have passed the test with a score of 60% or higher, but white male candidates were required to score at least 70%. Member of Parliament David Davies condemned the policy, stating "It's totally bonkers. They should just be picking the best man or woman for the job. They shouldn't be lowering the target for anyone just to meet a target." The service has target of 60% of new recruits to be female by 2021 and 35% to be ethnic minorities. In repose to criticism, the WMFS did not comment on whether it had different pass marks for different groups, but said that it was committed to diversity among the firefighting force.

See also 
 Fire service in the United Kingdom
 List of British firefighters killed in the line of duty
 West Midlands Police
 West Midlands Ambulance Service
 West Midlands Search and Rescue

References

External links 

 
West Midlands Fire Service at HMICFRS

Local government in the West Midlands (county)
Fire and rescue services of England
1974 establishments in the United Kingdom